The Hartbach (also called Reichersberger Bach) is a river of Upper Austria, a small tributary of the Inn.

The Hartbach originates in the Senftenbach area.

References

Rivers of Upper Austria
Rivers of Austria